Lucie Šafránková (born 21 May 1987) is a Czech politician and an MP in the Chamber of Deputies for the Freedom and Direct Democracy (SPD).

Šafránková holds a degree in psychology from Prague University. In the 2017 Czech legislative election, she was elected to the Chamber of Deputies on second place for the South Moravia constituency. In 2018, she was elected to Brno city council for the SPD.

References 

1987 births
Living people
21st-century Czech politicians
Freedom and Direct Democracy MPs
Politicians from Brno
Members of the Chamber of Deputies of the Czech Republic (2017–2021)
Members of the Chamber of Deputies of the Czech Republic (2021–2025)